Assa Hougoud is a city in central Djibouti. It is situated at the crossroads of the National Highway 9 and National Highway 11.

References
https://maps.google.com/maps?gcx=c&q=assa+hougoud&um=1&ie=UTF-8&sa=N&hl=en&tab=wl

Populated places in Djibouti